Yale University Press is the university press of Yale University. It was founded in 1908 by George Parmly Day, and became an official department of Yale University in 1961, but it remains financially and operationally autonomous.

, Yale University Press publishes approximately 300 new hardcover and 150 new paperback books annually and has a backlist of about 5,000 books in print. Its books have won five National Book Awards, two National Book Critics Circle Awards and eight Pulitzer Prizes.

The press maintains offices in New Haven, Connecticut and London, England. Yale is the only American university press with a full-scale publishing operation in Europe. It was a co-founder of the distributor TriLiteral LLC with MIT Press and Harvard University Press. TriLiteral was sold to LSC Communications in 2018.

Series and publishing programs

Yale Series of Younger Poets 

Since its inception in 1919, the Yale Series of Younger Poets Competition has published the first collection of poetry by new poets. The first winner was Howard Buck; the 2011 winner was Katherine Larson.

Yale Drama Series 
Yale University Press and Yale Repertory Theatre jointly sponsor the Yale Drama Series, a playwriting competition. The winner of the annual competition is awarded the David C. Horn Prize of $10,000, publication of his/her manuscript by Yale University Press, and a staged reading at Yale Rep. The Yale Drama Series and David C. Horn Prize are funded by the David Charles Horn Foundation.

Anchor Yale Bible Series 
In 2007, Yale University Press acquired the Anchor Bible Series, a collection of more than 115 volumes of biblical scholarship, from the Doubleday Publishing Group. New and backlist titles are now published under the Anchor Yale Bible Series name.

Future of American Democracy Series 
Yale University Press is publishing the Future of American Democracy Series, which "aims to examine, sustain, and renew the historic vision of American democracy in a series of books by some of America's foremost thinkers", in partnership with the Future of American Democracy Foundation.

The Lamar Series in Western History 
The Lamar Series in Western History (formerly the Yale Western Americana series) was established in 1962 to publish works that enhance the understanding of human affairs in the American West and contribute to a wider understanding of why the West matters in the political, social, and cultural life of America.

Terry Lectures Series 
The Dwight H. Terry Lectureship was established in 1905 to encourage the consideration of religion in the context of modern science, psychology, and philosophy. Many of the lectures, which are hosted by Yale University, have been edited into book form by the Yale University Press.

Yale Nota Bene 
On September 22, 2000, Yale University Press announced a new Yale Nota Bene imprint that would "feature reprints of best-selling and classic Yale Press titles encompassing works of history, religion, science, current affairs, reference and biography, in addition to fiction, poetry and drama."

Controversies

Mangling the typesetting of Mises' Human Action
In 1963, the Press published a revised edition of Ludwig von Mises's Human Action. In the May 5, 1964 issue of National Review, Henry Hazlitt wrote the story "Mangling a Masterpiece", accusing Yale University Press of intentionally typesetting the new edition in an amateurish fashion, due to the Press's differing ideological beliefs.

Muhammad cartoon controversy
In August, 2009, officials at the Press ignited a controversy when they decided to expunge reproductions of the cartoons involved in the Jyllands-Posten Muhammad cartoons controversy, along with all other images of Muhammad, from a scholarly book entitled The Cartoons that Shook the World, by professor Jytte Klausen.

See also

 List of English-language book publishing companies
 List of university presses

References

External links

 
 Yale University Press, London
 Yale University Press Records. Yale Collection of American Literature, Beinecke Rare Book and Manuscript Library.

 
Yale University
Visual arts publishing companies
Book publishing companies based in Connecticut
Publishing companies established in 1908
University presses of the United States
1908 establishments in Connecticut